Bishop McGuinness Catholic High School is a private, Roman Catholic high school in Kernersville, North Carolina, minutes from downtown Greensboro and Winston-Salem.  It operates under the direction of the Roman Catholic Diocese of Charlotte.

Background
It is the only Catholic high school in the Piedmont Triad area. The school was named in honor of Eugene Joseph McGuinness (1889–1957), the second Bishop of the Diocese of Raleigh. In 2007, Bishop McGuinness was named one of the nation's top 50 Catholic high schools by the National Catholic High School Honor Roll.

Partner schools
 Our Lady of Grace Catholic School, Greensboro
 Blessed Sacrament School, Burlington
 Our Lady of Mercy Catholic School, Winston-Salem
 Saint Leo Parish School, Winston-Salem
 Immaculate Heart of Mary Catholic School, High Point
 Saint Pius X Catholic School, Greensboro
 Sacred Heart School, Salisbury

Sports
The mascot for Bishop McGuinness is the Villain. The mascot comes from the school's predecessor, the Villa Marie Anna Academy. They are members of the North Carolina High School Athletic Association (NCHSAA).

Basketball

The boys basketball team won two NCHSAA State Championships in 2009 and again in 2019. The 2009 team holds the school record for most wins in a season (31) and the best overall record (31–2). Boys Basketball has claimed 6 state championships: 1963, 1982, 1983, 1987, 2009, and 2019.

In 2014, the girls basketball team (the Lady Villains) won its ninth consecutive state championship, a NCHSAA Record, and tied for the 2nd longest consecutive state championship win streak nationally.

Cross-country
The Boys' Cross Country team has qualified for the NCHSAA 1A Regional and State meets seven consecutive times since 2005, finishing as low as eight, with their highest finish of third place in the 2011 NCHSAA 1A State Championship at Beeson Park. They have won the NCHSAA Northwest 1A Conference title in 2009 and 2011, as well as having won the NCHSAA 1A Midwest Regional Meet in both 2007 and 2011. They have won the state title twice, in 2012 and 2013.

The Girls' Cross Country team has an even more exceptional record. Although they have only appeared in the NCHSAA State Meet since 2006, they have been awarded runners-up three times. They have won the Midwest 1A Regional and Northwest 1A Conference meets five of the past six years, and holds the NCHSAA 1A State Title for 2008, 2012, and 2013.

Boys' tennis
The Boys' Tennis team won the 2011 NCHSAA 1A State Championship defeating the North Carolina School of Math and Science in the final. In addition to the team championship, Senior Joseph Riazzi won the NCHSAA 1A individual doubles state championship.

Volleyball 
The Girls' Volleyball team won NCHSAA Northwest 1A Conference title in the 2020 season with a 12-1 overall (8-1 conference) record, advancing to the Final Four of the 1A State Championship. In 2021 they repeated as conference champions with a 26-6-1 overall (12-0 conference) record, winning the conference tournament, and advancing to Elite Eight of the 1A State Championship.

See also

List of high schools in North Carolina
National Catholic Educational Association

Notes and references

Catholic secondary schools in North Carolina
Piedmont Triad
Schools in Forsyth County, North Carolina
Educational institutions established in 1959
1959 establishments in North Carolina